Kellum-Noble House is a historic building in Houston, Texas.  It is the oldest surviving building in Houston resting on its original foundation.  The building was built in 1847 in a Greek Revival style and was added to the National Register of Historic Places in 1975.

References

See also
List of the oldest buildings in Texas

		
National Register of Historic Places in Harris County, Texas
Buildings and structures completed in 1847